Violette is a female given name and a surname.

It may also refer to:
 Violette AC, a football club based in Port-au-Prince, Haiti
 Violette (film), a 2013 French drama film
 , a Royal Navy minesweeper transferred to France in 1955 and renamed Violette
 stage name of Eva Marie Veigel (1724–1822), dancer and wife of actor David Garrick

See also
 Candied violets, known in France as violettes de Toulouse
 Violetta (disambiguation)
 Violeta (disambiguation)
 Violet (disambiguation)